The ace of hearts is a playing card in the standard 52-card deck.

Ace of Hearts may also refer to:
 The Ace of Hearts (1921 film), a silent film starring Lon Chaney, Sr.
 Ace of Hearts (2008 film), directed by David Mackay
 Ace of Hearts Records, a budget record label owned by Decca records
 Ace of Hearts Records (Boston), a Boston-based record label started in 1978
 "Ace of Hearts" (Chris Rea song), 1984
 Ace of Hz, a song and EP by Ladytron
Ace of Hearts, a band created by Jacob Rabon IV

See also

 or 

 Ace of Clubs (disambiguation)
 Ace of Diamonds (disambiguation)
 Ace of Spades (disambiguation)
 Jack of Hearts (disambiguation)
 Queen of Hearts (disambiguation)
 King of Hearts (disambiguation)